Karl Tutwiler Adams (August 11, 1891 – September 17, 1967), nicknamed "Rebel", was an American right-handed pitcher in Major League Baseball. He played for the Cincinnati Reds (1914) and Chicago Cubs (1915) of the National League, compiling a 1-9 won-lost record in his brief career.

Adams was a native of Columbus, Georgia. He died in Everett, Washington, where he had lived for the previous 27 years. He was a veteran of World War I and a member of the Veterans of Foreign Wars Old Guard Post 2100. After baseball, Karl worked for a number of years as a golf professional in Illinois and Kentucky. He was also a member of the Plumber and Pipefitters Union Local 265 and the Port Gardner Golf Club at Everett's Municipal Golf Course.

References

Everett Herald, Monday, Sept. 18, 1967 Section 2D Col. 7.

External links

1891 births
1967 deaths
Major League Baseball pitchers
Baseball players from Columbus, Georgia
Chicago Cubs players
Cincinnati Reds players
Montgomery Rebels players
Savannah Colts players
Indianapolis Indians players
Evansville Evas players
Sioux City Indians players
St. Joseph Drummers players
Toledo Mud Hens players
Tulsa Oilers (baseball) players
St. Joseph Saints players
San Antonio Bears players
Oklahoma City Indians players
Danville Veterans players